Deuterated dichloromethane (CD2Cl2) is a form (called an isotopologue) of dichloromethane (DCM, CH2Cl2) in which the hydrogen atoms ("H") are replaced with deuterium (heavy hydrogen) isotope ("D"). Deuterated DCM is not a common solvent used in NMR spectroscopy as it is expensive compared to deuterated chloroform.

References

Deuterated solvents